Crepidodera decolorata is an extinct species of flea beetles described from the late Eocene Rovno amber of Ukraine.

References

Eocene insects
†
Prehistoric beetles
Fossil taxa described in 2010
Prehistoric insects of Europe
Rovno amber